This is a list of educational institutions located in Astana, Kazakhstan.

Higher education
L.N.Gumilyov Eurasian National University
Nazarbayev University
S.Seifullin Kazakh Agro Technical University
Kazakh Humanities and Law Institute
Kazakh National University of Arts
Kazakh University of Economics, Finance and International Trade
Astana Medical University

Secondary education
Private schools in Nur-Sultan:

Miras International School
Haileybury Astana
Nur-Orda International School
Astana Kazakh-Turkish High School
Nazarbayev Intellectual Schools
QSI International School of Astana

 
Lists of universities and colleges in Asia
Kazakhstan education-related lists